The 2004–05 Slovenian Ice Hockey League was the 14th season of the Slovenian Hockey League. Seven teams participated in the league, and Olimpija have won the league championships.

Regular season

Play-offs

Final
Olimpija – Jesenice (4–1, 3–0, 4–2, 1–2)

3rd place
Slavija – Kranjska Gora (5–0, 8–1, 9–2)

References
Season on hockeyarchives.info

1
Slovenia
Slovenian Ice Hockey League seasons